Sphaerodactylus exsul is a species of lizard in the family Sphaerodactylidae. It is endemic to the Swan Islands in Honduras.

References

Sphaerodactylus
Reptiles of Honduras
Endemic fauna of Honduras
Reptiles described in 1914
Taxa named by Thomas Barbour